Hong Minpyo (born May 9, 1984) is a professional Go player.

Biography
Hong became a 4 dan in 2004. He reached the quarter finals of the biggest international tournament, the LG Cup, in 2006. He reached 9 dan in 2015.

External links
Sensei's Library
Korea Baduk Association profile (in Korean)

1984 births
Living people
South Korean Go players